Karen Lesley Grylls  (born 9 July 1951) is a New Zealand choral conductor. She is an associate professor in choral conducting at the University of Auckland and founder of Voices New Zealand Chamber Choir.

Early life and education 
Grylls was born in Pahiatua on 9 July 1951. As her father worked for the Post Office, the family moved around the country during her childhood. She was educated at Napier Girls' High School, Hokitika High School, and Central Southland College, where she was dux in 1968.

Grylls completed Bachelor of Arts and Bachelor of Music degrees at the University of Otago in 1973, followed by a Diploma of Teaching from the University of Canterbury in 1974. In 1980, she gained a Master of Music degree at the University of Auckland. She then gained a Master of Music in choral conducting in 1983 and a PhD in 1993, both from the University of Washington in Seattle. The title of her doctoral thesis was The aggregate re-ordered: a paradigm for Stravinsky's Requiem canticles.

Career 
From 1989 to 2011, Grylls conducted the New Zealand Youth Choir. In 1992, the Youth Choir won the Silver Rose Bowl award at the international choral competition Let the Peoples Sing. She founded the Voices New Zealand Chamber Choir in 1998.  In 2011, she became artistic director of Toronto's Exultate Chamber Choir for two years. Since 1986, Grylls has been a lecturer in music at the University of Auckland, rising to become an associate professor in 2000.

Grylls has been a judge at numerous international choral competitions and festivals.

Honours and awards 
In the 1999 New Year Honours, Grylls was appointed an Officer of the New Zealand Order of Merit, for services to choral music. She received an Auckland University Distinguished Teaching Award in music in 1996 for excellence in teaching. In 2006, she received a KBB Citation for Services to New Zealand Music from the Composers Association of New Zealand.

Selected works

References

External links 
 Interview on RNZ, 24 June 2010
 Interview on RNZ, 6 July 2019

1951 births
Living people
People from Pahiatua
People educated at Napier Girls' High School
People educated at Westland High School, Hokitika
People educated at Central Southland College
University of Otago alumni
University of Auckland alumni
Academic staff of the University of Auckland
New Zealand choral conductors
Officers of the New Zealand Order of Merit
University of Washington alumni
University of Canterbury alumni
New Zealand women academics
Women conductors (music)